The Deer River is a river of Minnesota.  It is a tributary of the Mississippi River.

Deer River is an English translation of the native Ojibwe-language name.

See also
List of rivers of Minnesota

References

Rivers of Itasca County, Minnesota
Rivers of Minnesota
Tributaries of the Mississippi River